Promontorium Agarum is a raised mountainous cape protruding into the southeast of Mare Crisium on the near side of the Moon. It protrudes into the mare up to 40 km and its width is about 80 km.

Promontorium Agarum was named in 1647 by Johannes Hevelius, who assigned names of terrestrial features to the lunar ones. It is one of only 4 features which still bear the names given by Hevelius.

References

Mountains on the Moon